Viktor Serhiyovych Tsybulenko (13 July 1930 – 19 October 2013) was a Ukrainian javelin thrower who represented the Soviet Union.

He competed for the Soviet Union at the 1952, 1956 and 1960 Olympics and won a gold medal in 1960 and a bronze in 1956, while finishing fourth in 1952. For these achievements he was awarded the Order of the Red Banner of Labour in 1960 and the Order of the Badge of Honor in 1957.

Tsybulenko was ranked within the world's top 10 javelin throwers in 1952–62, except for 1955; his best placement was second in 1962 and third in 1960. Nationally he won the Soviet title in 1952, 1955–57 and 1959.

After finishing his athletics career Tsybulenko served in the Soviet Army, retiring in 1985 with a rank of colonel. He then returned to the javelin throw and won the 1994 World Masters Championships.

Tsybulenko was born in village of Vepryk, Fastiv Raion in 1930. In 1931 father of Viktor, Serhiy Tsybulenko, was "dekurkulized" (Dekulakization, a process of taking away personal property from peasants by the Soviet state) and in 1933 Tsybulenko family moved to Kyiv running away from further persecutions. In Vepryk Tsybulenko family used to own  of land and horses that died ithree months after being taken away to collective farm (kolkhoz). On the son's question why Serhiy Tsybulenko did not foresee the situation and join the collective farm, he answered that after being labeled as "kurkul", he could not do that. Viktor Tsybulenko testified that in 1933 a lot of people died from famine, but his grandma unlike most villagers had a root cellar in her house, which the Soviet prodotryads (food requisitioning detachment) were not able to reach.

See also
 Mykola Tsybulenko

References

1930 births
2013 deaths
Ukrainian male javelin throwers
Soviet male javelin throwers
Olympic gold medalists for the Soviet Union
Olympic bronze medalists for the Soviet Union
Athletes (track and field) at the 1952 Summer Olympics
Athletes (track and field) at the 1956 Summer Olympics
Athletes (track and field) at the 1960 Summer Olympics
Olympic athletes of the Soviet Union
Armed Forces sports society athletes
European Athletics Championships medalists
Medalists at the 1960 Summer Olympics
Medalists at the 1956 Summer Olympics
Olympic gold medalists in athletics (track and field)
Olympic bronze medalists in athletics (track and field)
Sportspeople from Kyiv Oblast